Fuquan may refer to:

Fuquan, Guizhou (福泉市), county-level city
Fuquan, Zhejiang (福全镇), town in Shaoxing County
Fuquan Township, Fujian (富泉乡), in Yongtai County
Fuquan Township, Sichuan (富泉乡), in Hanyuan County
Fuquan (prince) (福全), a Manchu noble of the Qing dynasty
Fuquan Olympic School (福泉奥林匹克学校), in Jiangmen, Guangdong